Mochi is an Italian surname. Notable people with the surname include:

Clara Mochi (born 1956), Italian fencer
Fabio Mochi (born 1957), Italian designer
Francesco Mochi (1580–1654), Italian Baroque sculptor
Juan Mochi (1831–1892), Italian painter
Orazio Mochi (1571–1625), Italian sculptor of the late-Mannerist period, active mainly in Florence
Ugo Mochi (1889–1977), Italian illustrator, sculptor and designer 
Xochi Mochi, American drag queen

Italian-language surnames